Navy Bill is a sculpture of the United States Naval Academy's mascot, Bill the Goat, a billy goat.  It was designed by Clemente Spampinato in 1956, and presented to the academy in 1957. Until 2010, the sculpture stood just inside Gate 1 to the academy.  Following a five-year refurbishment underwritten by the Class of 1965, the statue was returned to Gate 1. A second statue commissioned by the Class of 1965 was placed in the north end zone of Navy–Marine Corps Memorial Stadium on 9 June 2015. It was rededicated 24 October 2015. Navy Bill has the alternate name of Goat Mascot.

Description

The base is granite and measures . The surmounting sculpture is bronze and measures . Navy Bill was noted as needing treatment in 1994. It was refurbished by the Class of 1965 in 2015. Sculptor Tony Thamasangvarn and the Baltimore New Arts Foundry added "rank insignia, warfare devices, shrapnel from Vietnam, and a cube of steel from a nuclear submarine" donated by the class in the recast Navy Bill at the football stadium.

The N on Navy Bill's blanket is a varsity letter, while the two stars ("N-stars" in Academy parlance) represent two victories over West Point in annual Army-Navy varsity competitions.

Inscriptions
Inscribed on the sculpture's bronze foundation is CLEM SPAMPINATO © 1956 to the back and MODERN ART FDRY. NY to the front. On a plaque behind the sculpture:

On a small plaque in front of the sculpture:

History

The main inscription's attribution to 1890 legend is not agreed with in modern study. The first use of a live goat as the academy's mascot was 1893.  Navy Bill is the inspiration for the academy's sports logo.

References

Monuments and memorials in Maryland
1956 sculptures
United States Naval Academy